() is a district of Zhoushan City made of 128 islands in Zhejiang province, China.The total area is 1,444 square kilometres.The land area is 568.8 square kilometers, the sea area is 875.2 square kilometers, and the coastline is more than 400 kilometers.It is based on the larger northwestern half of Zhoushan Island, where it borders Putuo in the east. The district boundary meets that of Daishan County out at sea to the north of the island. Its southwestern boundary intersects the border of Ningbo, also entirely at sea.

The district, which was formed in January 1987 when it was upgraded from county status, has a population of 399,382 as of 2019.

History 
According to the Dinghai People's Government, the area of Dinghai has been inhabited by humans for over 5,000 years.

During the Spring and Autumn period, the area was known as Yongdong, and belonged to the Yue state.

The area was incorporated as Wenshan County in 738 CE. In 771 CE, the county was abolished and placed under Mao County.

In 1073, the area was organized as Changguo County, and was placed under the jurisdiction of the Ming Prefecture.

Dinghai County was first established in 1688, under the Qing Dynasty.

During the First Opium War, Dinghai was taken by British forces on July 6, 1840. Dinghai was handed back by Charles Elliot, but was subsequently re-captured by Henry Pottinger, on October 1, 1841.

Dinghai was taken by the People's Liberation Army on May 17, 1950.

In October 1958, Zhoushan's prefecture-level status was revoked, and the area became part of Zhoushan County. In April 1962, Zhoushan was restored to prefecture-level status, and Dinghai County was re-established.

In January 1987, Dinghai County became Dinghai District.

Geography 
Dinghai District has a total area of 1,444.0 square kilometres, of which, 568.8 square kilometres is land, and the remaining 875.2 square kilometres is sea.Located in northeast Zhejiang Province, southeast Shanghai, Hangzhou Bay, the outer edge of the East China Sea.

Other islands include Changzhi Island and Panzhi Island. Many of the islands have hilly terrain, and the highest point in the district is Huangyanjian Mountain, which reaches 503.6 meters in altitude.

The area is rich in marine life, with 80 species of fish, and over 150 species of shellfish. The endangered black-faced spoonbill, the yellow-billed egret, the horned grebe, and other species of birds are also native to the island.

Climate 
North subtropical southern margin of the marine monsoon climate, warm in winter and cool in summer, mild and humid, plenty of light.

The district experiences an average temperature of 16.8 °C. The district's coldest month is January, which averages 6.2 °C in temperature, and the district's warmest month is August, which averages 27.4 °C in temperature. The coldest temperature recorded in the district was −4.2 °C, which occurred on December 28, 1991. The warmest temperature recorded in the district was 40.2 °C, which occurred on July 21, 2007.

Average annual rainfall in Dinghai is 1410.8 millimetres, and the district experiences an average of 149 rainy days per year.

The area experiences typhoons, heavy rains, floods, and droughts. The district was hit by a blizzard on March 12, 2005, which bought the most snowfall to the area since 1978.

Administrative divisions

Dinghai District administers consisted of 10 subdistricts and 3 towns. As of 2019, these township-level divisions were further divided into 41 residential communities, 73 rural villages, and 7 urban villages.

Historic divisions 
In July 1994, the district had 4 subdistricts, 7 towns, and 14 townships. The district's 4 subdistricts were Changguo Subdistrict, Huannan Subdistrict, Chengdong Subdistrict, and the now-defunct Jiefang Subdistrict. The district's 7 towns were Xiaosha (now a subdistrict), Cengang (now a subdistrict), Lincheng (now a subdistrict), Baiquan, Ganlan, the now-defunct Dafeng, and the now-defunct Ligang. The district's 14 townships were Ma'ao Township (now a subdistrict), Shantan Township, Changbai Township, Dasha Township, Yandun Township, Mamu Township, Cezi Township, Shijiao Township, Yancang Township (now a subdistrict), Ziwei Township, Changzhi Township, Beichan Township, Panzhi Township, and Damao Township.

By 2000, Ma'ao was promoted from a township to a town.

In September 2004, Lincheng was promoted from a town to a subdistrict.

In May 2008, the town of Jintang was set up.

In 2017, Qiandao Subdistrict split off from Lincheng Subdistrict.

Demographics 
As of 2019, Dinghai District has a population of 399,382 people, an increase of 1,813 (0.456%) from 2018. The district has 96.58 males per 100 females.

In the 2000 Chinese Census, the district had a population of 369,448.

Economy 
The district had a GDP of ¥31 billion as of 2011.

Character 

 Qiao Shi（乔石）
 San Mao（三毛）

References

External links 
 Official site 

Districts of Zhoushan
Island counties of China